The Lille Métropole Half Marathon (French: Semi-Marathon de Lille Métropole) is an annual half marathon foot race which takes place in Lille, France, in early September. First organised by the Association de Promotion des Événements Lillois in 1986, the race began as a marathon event before switching to the shorter distance in 1996. The course of the race begins in the Boulevard de la Liberté and finishes at the front of Lille's city hall on Rue de Paris.

The French Half Marathon Championships were held concurrently with the final edition of the marathon race in 1995. Bruno Leger was the men's winner with a time of 1:02:31 while Christine Mallo took the women's title in 1:12:05. The half marathon race has delivered some fast winning times – the 2009 race saw the top three men run under an hour and Mary Keitany ran the seventh quickest run ever to become the women's race winner. The men's course record of 59:05, set by Ezekiel Chebii in 2012, is the fastest ever recorded for the distance in France.

Past winners
Key:

Marathon

Half marathon

Statistics
Note: Data for half marathon race only

Winners by country

Multiple winners

References

List of winners
 Civai, Franco & Lefeuvre, Thierry (2009-09-06). Lille Métropole Half Marathon. Association of Road Racing Statisticians. Retrieved on 2010-04-06.

External links
Official website 



Half marathons in France
Sport in Lille
Recurring sporting events established in 1986
Annual sporting events in France
1986 establishments in France
Autumn events in France